Allan Morante (born 13 August 1994) is a French trampoline gymnast. He competed in the 2020 Summer Olympics.

Morante won a gold medal in the men's individual trampoline event at the 2022 European Trampoline Championships in Rimini, Italy.

References

1994 births
Living people
Gymnasts from Paris
People from Drancy
Gymnasts at the 2020 Summer Olympics
French male trampolinists
Olympic gymnasts of France
21st-century French people